Víctor Manuel Gandarilla Carrasco (born 20 November 1944) is a Mexican politician from the Institutional Revolutionary Party. He has served as Deputy of the XLVIII, LV and LVIII Legislatures of the Mexican Congress representing Sinaloa.

Has also served as Deputy of both XLVII and LV to the Sinaloa State Legislature, has also been Secretary General of the Liga de Comunidades Agrarias and President of the Institutional revolutionary Party (PRI) in the State of Sinaloa.

References

1944 births
Living people
People from Culiacán
Institutional Revolutionary Party politicians
Politicians from Sinaloa
21st-century Mexican politicians
Deputies of the LVIII Legislature of Mexico
Members of the Chamber of Deputies (Mexico) for Sinaloa